Phillip Terrence "Terry" Ragon is an American entrepreneur and philanthropist who founded InterSystems and is the current CEO.

Early life and education

The son of a U.S. Air Force fighter pilot, Ragon was born in Arizona. He grew up in a variety of states and graduated from high school in Bogota, Colombia. He graduated from MIT in 1971 with a B.S. in physics.

Career

In 1978, Phillip Ragon founded InterSystems Corporation in Cambridge, Massachusetts, to develop and sell database management and healthcare information systems. He is currently the CEO and owner.

Ragon is a member of the Harvard Medical School Board of Fellows, and a member of MIT Corporation (the governing body of MIT), and a member of the advisory board of the MIT Jameel Clinic.

In 2020, with a net worth of $2.2 billion, Forbes ranked Ragon No. 378 on the Forbes 400 list of the richest people in America.

Philanthropy

In March 2017, Ragon, and wife Susan, signed The Giving Pledge, vowing to donate at least half of their money to philanthropic causes.

In 2009, Ragon pledged to donate US $100 million over 10 years period for AIDS research through the Phillip T. and Susan M. Ragon Institute at the Massachusetts General Hospital (MGH) after witnessing the plight of the disease in South Africa. The Ragons donated $200 million to MGH in 2019, the largest donation in the hospital's history.

In April 2019, Ragon and his wife announced that they were donating a further $200 million to Massachusetts General Hospital for a vaccine-research center.

Awards and Honors
In 2022, Ragon received the Golden Plate Award of the American Academy of Achievement.

References

Living people
21st-century philanthropists
American technology chief executives
Giving Pledgers
Harvard Medical School people
Massachusetts General Hospital benefactors
MIT Department of Physics alumni

Year of birth missing (living people)